Bangur Nagar is a residential area in Goregaon West, Mumbai, India. It was developed by the Bangur Group of Kolkata in the mid-1970s.

Bangur Nagar has more than 20 co-operative housing societies, most over 30 years old. The Hari niketan, Jal Mangal Deep, Heeramani Ratan societies are few of the oldest. Among the newer buildings are Vasant Galaxy and Polaris.
Bangur is a happening place. Here, most of the social activity is conducted by various Charitable Trusts like Bangur Ramayan Mandal Charitable Trust, Agrawal Seva Samiti., Bangur Nagar Nagrik Sangh, etc.

Bangur Nagar is in Mumbai North West Lok Sabha constituency and Goregaon (Vidhan Sabha constituency) Vidhan Sabha constituency.

Majority of the people living in Bangur nagar are South Indian and Marwadi.

Facilities

Schools
 Bangur Nagar Vidya Bhavan school and Junior College of Commerce and Economics
Address
Plot No 9 Bangur Nagar, 
Goregaon West,
Mumbai - 400090 
Maharashtra 

 MTS Khalsa High School and Junior College of Commerce
Plot No 143, 
Sitaram Mandir Road, 
Jankalyan CHS, 
Bangur Nagar, 
Goregaon West, 
Mumbai, 
Maharashtra 400104.

 Vivek Vidyalaya and Junior College
S.S. Shankar Marg, 
Siddharth Nagar, 
Goregaon West, 
Siddharth Nagar 4, 
Goregaon West, Mumbai, 
Maharashtra 400104

 St. Thomas Academy
M.G. Road, 
Cardinal Gracias Nagar, 
Mitha Nagar, 
Goregaon West, Mumbai, 
Maharashtra 400062

Places of worship
 Ram Mandir
 Ayyappa Temple
 Hanuman Mandir
 Kali Mata Mandir 
 Jain Temple
 Khalsa Gurudwara 
 St. Peter's Marthoma Church
 Rosary Church

Banks
 The Shamrao Vithal Co-operative Bank Ltd.
 State Bank of India
 Indian Overseas Bank
 Canara Bank

ATMs
 State Bank of India
 SVC bank
 IOB
 HDFC

Post office
 Bangur Nagar Post Office

Parks
There are two big parks (Laxmi park and Visnu park) which are often leased out for marriage functions. These open spaces are not available to the public and do not have recreational activities.

Connectivity

The Mahatma Gandhi Road connects the Goregaon Railway Station with Bangur Nagar. The BEST provides bus services from Goregaon Railway station - 262 and 204. Besides, over a dozen BEST bus routes connect Bangur Nagar with North and South Mumbai. 
The Metro 2A line (to be operational in 2022) has a station at the southern end of Bangur Nagar.

Nearby landmarks
Inorbit Mall, HyperCity and Mindspace Office Complex are near Bangur Nagar.

References

External links
 Wikimapia 
 Vasant Galaxy

Neighbourhoods in Mumbai